Three ships of the United States Navy have been named Downes, in honor of Captain John Downes.

United States Navy ship names